Marianne Werner (Schulze-Entrup, later Ader, born 4 January 1924), is a retired West German athlete who specialized in throwing events. She competed in the shot put and discus throw at the 1952 and 1956 Olympics and earned two medals in the shot put. Werner won the European title in this event in 1958 and finished fifth in 1954.

References

1924 births
Living people
People from Dülmen
Sportspeople from Münster (region)
West German female shot putters
Athletes (track and field) at the 1952 Summer Olympics
Athletes (track and field) at the 1956 Summer Olympics
Olympic athletes of Germany
Olympic athletes of the United Team of Germany
Olympic silver medalists for Germany
Olympic bronze medalists for the United Team of Germany
European Athletics Championships medalists
Medalists at the 1956 Summer Olympics
Medalists at the 1952 Summer Olympics
Olympic silver medalists in athletics (track and field)
Olympic bronze medalists in athletics (track and field)